William H. Abendroth (December 24, 1895 – September 3, 1970) was a United States Army major general who served as director of the Army National Guard and commander of the District of Columbia National Guard.

Early life
William Henry Abendroth, Jr., nicknamed Harry, was the son of a career soldier who served in the American Indian Wars and the Spanish–American War before retiring as a First Sergeant and becoming an instructor in military studies at the University of Idaho. The younger Abendroth was born in Fort Meade, South Dakota, on December 24, 1895.  He enlisted in the Idaho National Guard in 1913, and served as a member of Company H, 2nd Idaho Infantry Regiment on the Mexican border during the Pancho Villa Expedition.

Abendroth served with the army in France during World War I, first in an Infantry company, and later with an Engineer unit. He achieved the rank of first sergeant by the end of the war, and was discharged in 1919.

Resumption of military service
In 1927, Abendroth rejoined the Idaho National Guard and was commissioned as a second lieutenant of Cavalry. He quickly advanced through command and staff positions of increasing rank and responsibility, including serving as military aide to the Governor of Idaho with the rank of captain.  He commanded the 116th Cavalry Regiment as a colonel in the years immediately preceding the Second World War.

Abendroth also pursued a civilian career in state government, including appointments as a Purchasing Agent and Claims Examiner in the Purchasing Department, Budget Director for the State of Idaho, Disbursing Officer in the Highway Department, and Rural Electrification Manager for Idaho Power.

In 1938, Abendroth was tried on embezzlement charges, accused of taking money while working as a Purchasing Agent for the state. He was charged with three counts, one each for $50, $250 and $50. He received a directed verdict of acquittal from the judge after the primary witness against Abendroth impeached himself under direct examination by the prosecutor.

World War II
Abendroth was called to active duty for World War II.  Assigned to the Headquarters of the IX Corps, he was posted as commandant of the Officer Candidate School, provost marshal for the corps area and Commandant of the corps headquarters, serving in Hawaii, the Philippines, and Japan.

Post World War II
Upon returning to the United States Abendroth became a student at the United States Army Command and General Staff College, from which he graduated in 1946.

In April 1946 he was appointed adjutant general of the Idaho Military Department and federal director of Selective Service for Idaho, receiving promotion to brigadier general.  He served until December, when a change in the governorship led to his resignation, enabling the new governor to appoint his own candidate.

As a colonel, Abendroth was then called to active duty, serving in the National Guard and Reserve Policy Office for the Chief of Staff of the United States Army from 1947 to 1949.

In 1949, Abendroth was appointed commander of the District of Columbia National Guard. He received promotion to major general and served until retiring in 1967, when he was succeeded by Charles L. Southward. From 1951 to 1955, Abendroth also served as Chief of the Army Division (now Director of the Army National Guard) at the National Guard Bureau.

Retirement and death
In retirement, Abendroth resided in Falls Church, Virginia.  He died at Walter Reed Hospital in Washington, D.C. on September 3, 1970.  Abendroth is buried at Arlington National Cemetery, Section 5, Lot 21.

Awards and decorations
Abendroth received the Army Distinguished Service Medal at his retirement. He was also a recipient of the Legion of Merit for his service in World War II.

Legacy
The Abendroth Trophy is awarded each year to the best army or air force unit of the District of Columbia National Guard during annual training.

References

1895 births
1970 deaths
People from Meade County, South Dakota
People from Boise, Idaho
People from Falls Church, Virginia
United States Army Command and General Staff College alumni
United States Army personnel of World War I
United States Army personnel of World War II
United States Army generals
National Guard (United States) generals
Recipients of the Distinguished Service Medal (US Army)
Recipients of the Legion of Merit